Daniel Parrish Witter (July 2, 1852 – January 9, 1930) was an American farmer and politician from New York.

Life
Daniel Witter was born on July 2, 1852, on a farm in Richford, Tioga County, New York, the son of Asa Witter (1798–1884) and Delia (Torrey) Witter (1819–1909).He attended the common schools, and then worked on the family farm. On March 3, 1876, he married Sarah M. Belden (1857-1937), and they had two children.)

Witter was a member, and sometimes President, of several dairymen's and farmers' associations. He was Supervisor of the Town of Richford from 1891 to 1893.
 
Witter was a member of the New York State Assembly (Tioga Co.) in 1896, 1897, 1898, 1899 and 1900; and was Chairman of the Committee on Electricity, Gas and Water Supply in 1900.

He was again a member of the State Assembly in 1916, 1917, 1918, 1919, 1920, 1921, 1922, 1923, 1924, 1925, 1926, 1927, 1928 and 1929; and was Chairman of the Committee on Agriculture from 1918 to 1929.

Witter died on January 9, 1930, at his home in Berkshire, New York; and was buried at the Evergreen Cemetery there.

The Daniel Parrish Witter Agricultural Museum, located on the grounds of the Great New York State Fair, was named in his honor.

Sources

External links
 
 The Witter Agricultural Museum at New York State Agricultural Society

1852 births
1930 deaths
People from Richford, New York
Republican Party members of the New York State Assembly
Town supervisors in New York (state)